Andrew Mollo (born 15 May 1940 in Epsom, Surrey, England) is a British expert on military uniforms, which has led him into a career in motion pictures and as an author of various books on military uniforms.

Biography
Andrew Mollo is the son of a Russian father and British mother and the brother of costume designer and historical consultant John Mollo. In 1956, the family moved to London, where he studied at the Regent Street Polytechnic.

Film
In the late 1950s Mollo was approached by Kevin Brownlow for assistance regarding the development of his film It Happened Here. Initially, he was to advise on German uniforms but became so interested in the project that ended up co-writing, co-directing and co-producing the movie. The film took eight years to make and premiered in 1964.

Mollo worked for Woodfall Film Productions as a runner and then assistant director on 1960s 'Saturday Night and Sunday Morning and 1962's Loneliness of The Long Distance Runner.

Mollo's uniform expertise led him to create Historical Research Unit with his brothers. This provided film companies with advice on military history, especially uniforms. In 1965 Mollo worked as the technical advisor on Doctor Zhivago.

In the early 1970s Mollo wrote a number of books on military history and uniforms. He then worked again with Kevin Brownlow on the film Winstanley which he co-wrote, co-produced and co-directed. As a German-uniform consultant Mollo advised on films such as The Eagle Has Landed (1977), The Pianist (2002) and Downfall (2004).

He later undertook the role production designer for the 1985 film Dance With a Stranger. He also designed all 14 episodes of TV series Sharpe and Hornblower.

Mollo has written a number of books on 20th-century military uniforms, focusing on the uniforms of World War II and Nazi Germany.

Filmography (partial) 
 1964: It Happened Here
 1965: Doctor Zhivago
 1965: The Spy Who Came In From The Cold
 1967: The Night of the Generals
 1968: Where Eagles Dare
 1976: Winstanley
 1976: The Eagle Has Landed
 1985: Dance With a Stranger
 1986: Nanou
 1993: Sharpe
 2001: Conspiracy (2001 film)
 2002: The Pianist
 2004: Downfall

Bibliography (partial) 
 Andrew Mollo: Daggers of the Third German Reich 1933-1945 1967, Historical Research Unit
 Andrew Mollo and Malcolm McGregor: Naval, Marine and Air Force Uniforms of World War II 1975 
 Andrew Mollo & Pierre Taylor: Army Uniforms of World War 1. Arco Publishing, New York 1978 
 Andrew Mollo: Uniforms of the SS. The Crowood Press, 1998, 
 Andrew Mollo: The Armed Forces of World War II. Little, Brown & Company, 2002,

References

External links
Andrew Mollo at IMDB https://www.imdb.com/name/nm0597081/

1940 births
British film designers
English historical novelists
English military historians
English military writers
English screenwriters
English male screenwriters
German-language film directors
Living people
Historians of World War II
People from Epsom